Beausire is the name of the following persons:

 Jean Beausire (1651–1743), French architect, engineer and fountain-maker
 Nathalie Beausire, French biathlete
 William Beausire (born 1948), British stockbroker

See also
 Bowser (surname), an Anglicized form of the surname

Surnames of Norman origin
French-language surnames